The Texas Longhorns men's tennis team has played at The University of Texas as early as 1884, although it was not until 1909 that intercollegiate competition developed. Between that time and the advent of the Southwest Conference in 1915, Texas and Oklahoma annually held a meet for the championship of the Southwest. The first season of Texas Men's Tennis was in 1912. Since forming, the Men's Tennis team has won 17 Southwest Conference Championships, 5 Big 12 Championships and the 2019 NCAA Championship. Texas teams have reached the NCAA Championship semifinals five times (1993, 2006, 2008, 2009 and 2019) and prior to the formation of the tournament when the final standings were determined by a poll, the Longhorns finished fourth or better five times, including 1946 (4th), 1952 (tie 4th), 1955 (2nd), 1957 (3rd), and 1960 (tie 4th).

In March 2019 tennis head coach Michael Center was arrested and charged with conspiracy to commit mail fraud as part of the 2019 college admissions bribery scandal.

Despite losing their head coach to scandal just two months earlier, the Texas Men's Tennis team won its first ever NCAA tennis championship over Wake Forest in May 2019 under Coach Bruce Berque.

Head coach
Source

Yearly Record
Source

NCAA Singles Champions
Source

NCAA Doubles Champions
Source

Conference Singles Champions

Big 12
Source

Conference Doubles Champions

Big 12
Source

See also
Texas Longhorns women's tennis

References